Partidul Liberal Reformator may refer to:

Liberal Reformist Party (Moldova)
Liberal Reformist Party (Romania)